The Grant Schoolhouse in Georgetown, Ohio, was the school where Ulysses S. Grant attended from 1829 to 1835. Some of the furnishings in the school are from the period when Grant went to school there. The school is located at 508 S. Water St., Georgetown, Ohio 45121.

External links
 U.S. Grant Boyhood Home and Schoolhouse - Ohio History Connection
 US Grant Homestead Association

Museums in Brown County, Ohio
Presidential museums in Ohio
Education museums in the United States
Ohio History Connection
Defunct schools in Ohio
Ulysses S. Grant